Abiqua Creek is a tributary of the Pudding River in the U.S. state of Oregon. The creek originates near Lookout Mountain in the foothills of the Cascade Range in the northwestern part of the state.

The creek is the main source of drinking water for Silverton, which operates a diversion dam upstream. The city, the Pudding River Watershed Council, and the Oregon Department of Fish and Wildlife are working to improve fish passage on the creek and are studying the effectiveness of the dam's fish ladder. Abiqua Creek has historically supported the largest steelhead spawning populations in the Pudding River watershed.

Course
Ridges on the north and south separate its watershed from Silver Creek on the south and Butte Creek on the north.

Abiqua Falls 
Just below Goober Creek near Santiam State Forest, the stream plunges  over Abiqua Falls. Downstream of the falls, the creek runs close by Milk Ranch Road and then Abiqua Road, both on the right. At about RM 12 (RK 19), Abiqua Creek receives Hammond Creek, and shortly thereafter Echo Creek, and about  later, Powers Creek, all from the left.

Gallon House Bridge 
Shortly thereafter, it passes under Gallon House Road, which is carried by the covered Gallon House Bridge. It crosses under Mount Angel Highway before reaching the Pudding River,  by river from its confluence with the Molalla River.

Discharge
These figures do not include readings near flood stage because the district's monitor cannot safely measure the highest flows.

Reservoir and fish ladder
Abiqua Creek is the main water supply for the city of Silverton, which also gets water from Silver Creek and stores water in Silverton Reservoir. The Abiqua Creek water reaches the city from a diversion dam in the Cascade Range foothills at RM 10.4 (RK 16.7). The diversion dam's higher elevation above sea level allows water to flow to the Silverton water treatment plant without pumping.

In 2007, the city of Silverton, the Pudding River Watershed Council, and the Oregon Department of Fish and Wildlife (ODFW) began a project to improve fish passage on Abiqua Creek. The first stage of the project involves evaluating the effectiveness of the fish ladder on the city's diversion dam, built in 1916. The creek supports native populations of winter steelhead and has the potential to support spring chinook salmon. Abiqua Creek has historically supported the largest steelhead spawning populations in the Pudding River watershed. A catch-and-release fishing season for coastal cutthroat trout begins at the end of May, but the creek is closed to salmon and steelhead fishing.

See also
List of rivers of Oregon

References

External links
Photos of the creek from Flickr

Rivers of Oregon
Rivers of Marion County, Oregon